Michael Corcoran (born 12 April 1965) is an Irish slalom canoeist who competed from the mid-1980s to the late 1990s. Originally from Dublin in Ireland, he has also lived in Maryland in the US. Competing in two Summer Olympics, Corcoran earned his best finish of tenth in the C1 event in Atlanta in 1996. His twin daughters, Michaela Corcoran and Madison Corcoran, have also competed internationally in canoe slalom events.

World Cup individual podiums

References

1965 births
Canoeists at the 1992 Summer Olympics
Canoeists at the 1996 Summer Olympics
Irish male canoeists
Living people
Sportspeople from Dublin (city)
Olympic canoeists of Ireland